Bogoljub Mitić (12 January 1968 – 22 June 2017) professionally known as Đoša, was a Serbian actor and comedian, best known for his role as Bata Đoša from the Serbian television show Porodično blago which earned him the nickname.

Early life
He was born in Vlasotince, where he lived until he moved to Belgrade. In Vlasotince he was nicknamed Boge Miza.

Career
During his career, which spanned almost three decades, he had done work for theatre and television, but the role that outshined the rest of his profession was the role as Bata Đoša in the 1998 cult TV series "Porodično blago". 

Mitić also gained notoriety for being a contestant in the third season of the Serbian version of Your Face Sounds Familiar. He won in the seventh week performing his rendition of the musical Matilda, but finished 10th place overall.

Death
He died of a heart attack on 22 June 2017 in Belgrade. He was buried in Vlasotince.

References

1968 births
2017 deaths
People from Vlasotince
Serbian male television actors
Serbian male actors
Serbian male film actors